Denis Dufour (born 9 October 1953) is a composer of art music.

Biography 
Born in Lyon, after studying the classics at the CRR in Lyons and the Paris Conservatoire (particularly with Pierre Schaeffer and Ivo Malec), Dufour is recognized as a composer in the field of instrumental as well as electronic creation for concert with more than a 180 works to his credit. As one of the pioneers of the 'morphological' and expressive approach to sonic writing, his works employ a wide spectrum of parameters in all sonic dimensions. Following Pierre Schaeffer and Pierre Henry, he contributed to the emergence of a genre that decisively connects artists and musicians. "The exploration of new structures of sound, the fluidity of a 'Baroque' style of phrasing, the mobility of his figures, and his love of the human voice and of certain dramatic narrative effects have fostered the emergence of a new kind of theatrical sound in his work, over and beyond his strictly musical discourse.

Despite his large compositional output, from the late 1970s, he has been a teacher (at the Paris Boulogne-Billancourt (PSPBB) higher arts education centre, the Regional Conservatories of Paris, Perpignan, Lyons), researcher (including Groupe de Recherches Musicales until 2000), lecturer, and a host for several courses, workshops and master classes in France and abroad (particularly in Japan and Italy).

A tireless leader and advocate, with Jonathan Prager, of an approach to interpretation and spatialization on an acousmonium (system of sound spatialization – a loudspeaker orchestra) with sensitivity and accuracy as opposed to the rigidity of pre programmed multiphonics. Founder and initiator of the TM + ensemble, his work Ourlé du lac à la première goutte de pluie (Pli de Perversion 2'') performed at the ICMC in 1984 – is the first to use Syter, one of the first real-time digital processing devices. "Dufour was instrumental in identifying the need for space to check the parameters quickly and accurately. It was this observation that led to the development of the interpolations screen, which can memorise the status of all the system's parameters (a 'snapshot', as we would now call it), and enables the user to move very quickly from one configuration to another by jumps or interpolations (gradual evolution)." He also contributed significantly to the realization of the Acousmographe, a software for graphical representation of sound phenomena, produced by Institut national de l'audiovisuel.

An organizer and artistic director of several events dedicated to contemporary creation (the series Acore in Lyons, Syntax in Perpignan, Musiques à Réaction in Paris, Futura Festival in Drôme), he also founded several structures, collectives and instrumental formations that continue to irrigate the musical life in France and abroad (Motus, Futura, Syntax, TM+, Les Temps modernes...). Through the exchange of experiences between artists of various fixed medium disciplines (musicians, visual artists, photographers...) he welcomed a trans-disciplinary public seen at the Futura Festival in Drôme every summer since 1993. Since the early 2000s (decade), Dufour actively participated in the encouragement and development of acousmatic art in Japan.

Through Motus in 1996, he initiated two of the most important acousmoniums performing regularly in France and in Europe. Several annual interventions, particularly the invitation to the Palais de Tokyo have contributed to the reputation of Motus in the world of contemporary art.

Recognizing the need to broaden the scope of a type of creation made in a studio, fixed on a medium and delivered for listening on loudspeakers, he combined the various genres into what he calls acousmatic art, which offers an open definition (translated into several languages) and which is beyond mere musical terrain. In his hands, acousmatic art came to being a fertile musical genre, which, consciously or not, influenced a number of musicians and artists. Very aware of promoting cross-practice, he is involved in multiple partnerships in the visual arts (Galerie Lydie Rekow in Crest, National Superior Institute of Fine Arts in Perpignan, initial three years residence in the centre of contemporary art at the Domaine de Kerguéhennec, collaboration with visual artist Jaume Xifra and with Richard Serra in Monumenta 2008.

A composer of a variety of instrumental, vocal or acousmatic works he has always been deeply involved in the transgression of genres, plunging his experiences in the field of dance, video, mixed works (combining instrument and fixed audio media), the musical theatre, radio art – Hörspiel, installations and sound environments. A large number of his works use texts for which he collaborated with Michel Vincent, Jean-Christophe Thomas, Dominique Dubreuil, Marc Jaffeux and especially Thomas Brando with whom he has worked very closely on several compositions.

His instrumental, acousmatic and mixed media works are published by Maison Ona.

Works

Discography

References

External links 
 
 Contemporary music portal
 Who's Who in France
 Larousse encyclopedia
 Society of authors, composers and editors of music
 Maison ONA

1953 births
Living people
French male classical composers
Electroacoustic music composers
20th-century classical composers
21st-century classical composers
French opera composers
Male opera composers
Experimental composers
Microtonal musicians
Composers for piano
Composers for pipe organ
Composers for violin
Composers for cello
Composers for trombone
French experimental musicians
French electronic musicians
French sound artists
Musique concrète
20th-century French composers
21st-century French composers
20th-century French male musicians
21st-century French male musicians